Social Service Football Club was a football club from Bhutan, based at Changlimithang, who played in the inaugural Bhutan A-Division, then the top level of football in Bhutan, but since replaced by a full national league.

History
They finished second in the inaugural season, winning eight of their nine games, with their only loss coming against eventual winners Royal Bhutan Army. They were defensively very tight throughout the whole competition, conceding only four goals, with only the Army team producing a better defensive record. There are no records available for any competitions held between 1987–1995 so it is not known whether they competed again, and there is no record of them competing in any future season for which records exist.

Achievements
A-Division: 1 time runners-up
 1986

References

Football clubs in Bhutan
Sport in Thimphu